, historically called , is the largest and most populous island of Japan. It is located south of Hokkaidō across the Tsugaru Strait, north of Shikoku across the Inland Sea, and northeast of Kyūshū across the Kanmon Straits. The island separates the Sea of Japan, which lies to its north and west, from the North Pacific Ocean to the south and east. It is the seventh-largest island in the world, and the second-most populous after the Indonesian island of Java.

Honshu had a population of 104 million , constituting 81.3% of the entire population of Japan, and is mostly concentrated in the coastal areas and plains. Approximately 30% of the total population resides in the Greater Tokyo Area on the Kantō Plain. As the historical center of Japanese cultural and political power, the island includes several past Japanese capitals, including Kyōto, Nara and Kamakura. Much of the island's southern shore forms part of the Taiheiyō Belt, a megalopolis that spans several of the Japanese islands. Honshu contains Japan's highest mountain, Mount Fuji, and its largest lake, Lake Biwa.

Most of Japan's industry is located in a belt running along Honshu's southern coast, from Tokyo to Nagoya, Kyōto, Osaka, Kobe, and Hiroshima; by contrast, the economy along the northwestern Sea of Japan coast is largely based on fishing and agriculture. The island is linked to the other three major Japanese islands by a number of bridges and tunnels. The island primarily shares two climates, with Northern Honshu being mainly humid continental climate while the south has a humid subtropical climate.

Etymology
The name of the island, directly translates to "main province" in English.

History

Early history
Humans first arrived in Honshu about 60,000 years ago.

Meiji Restoration

World War II
The island of Honshu would become the target of devastating air raids as part of the Pacific War of World War II. The first air raid that would strike the island and the Home Islands would be the Doolittle Raid. The war would culminate in the atomic bombings of Hiroshima and Nagasaki shortly before Japan's surrender and signing of the Japanese Instrument of Surrender on September 2, 1945, on board  in Tokyo Bay.

Geography

Its land area has been increasing with land reclamation and coastal uplift in the north due to plate tectonics with a convergent boundary. Honshu has  of coastline.

Mountainous and volcanic, Honshu experiences frequent earthquakes (the Great Kantō earthquake heavily damaged Tokyo in September 1923, and the earthquake of March 2011 moved the northeastern part of the island by varying amounts of as much as  while causing devastating tsunamis). There are many rivers, including the Shinano River, Japan's longest. The Japanese Alps span the width of Honshu, from the 'Sea of Japan' coast to the Pacific shore. The climate is generally humid subtropical in western Japan and humid continental in the north.

Population
Honshu has a total population of 104 million people, according to a 2017 estimate, 81.3% of the entire population of Japan. The largest city is Tokyo (population: 37,339,804), the capital of Japan and part of the Greater Tokyo Area, the most populous metropolitan area in the world.

Extreme points

Bridges and tunnels
Honshu is connected to the islands of Hokkaidō, Kyūshū and Shikoku by tunnels and bridges. Three bridge systems have been built across the islands of the Inland Sea between Honshu and Shikoku (Akashi Kaikyō Bridge and the Ōnaruto Bridge; Shin-Onomichi Bridge, Innoshima Bridge, Ikuchi Bridge, Tatara Bridge, Ōmishima Bridge, Hakata–Ōshima Bridge, and the Kurushima-Kaikyō Bridge; Shimotsui-Seto Bridge, Hitsuishijima Bridge, Iwakurojima Bridge, Yoshima Bridge, Kita Bisan-Seto Bridge, and the Minami Bisan-Seto Bridge), the Seikan Tunnel connects Honshu with Hokkaidō, and the Kanmonkyo Bridge and Kanmon Tunnel connects Honshu with Kyūshū.

Flora and fauna
These are notable flora and fauna of Honshu.

{| class="wikitable sortable" 
|+ Notable flora and fauna 
|- 
! Name !! Type  
! Notes 
|- 
| Japanese black bear 
| Fauna  
| A subspecies of the Asian black bear. It is typically herbivorous and lives in Honshu and Kyushu. 
|- 
|Japanese macaque 
|Fauna 
|(Macaca fuscata or snow monkey), is a terrestrial Old World monkey species that is native to Japan. 
|- 
| Japanese golden eagle 
| Fauna 
| (Aquila chrysaetos japonica), a subspecies of the golden eagle, inhabits Honshu and Hokkaido all year round.
|- 
|Japanese wolf 
|Fauna 
|Aka Honshu Wolf is an extinct subspecies of the wolf. 
|- 
| Sika Deer 
| Fauna  
| Cervus nippon (Japanese deer), is overabundant in Honshu. 
|- 
| Japanese dwarf flying squirrel 
| Fauna 
| (Nihon momonga) is one of two species of Old World flying squirrels in the genus Pteromys.  
|- 
| Japanese raccoon dog 
| Fauna 
| (Nyctereutes viverrinus, also called tanuki), is a species of canid endemic to Japan. 
|- 
| Japanese giant salamander 
| Fauna 
| (Andrias japonicus) this fully aquatic salamander is endemic to Japan and called Ōsanshōuo (Giant Salamander)  
|- 
| Takydromus tachydromoides 
| Fauna 
| The Japanese grass lizard, is a wall lizard species of the genus Takydromus.  
|- 
|Japanese serow 
|Fauna 
|(kamoshika, lit. "coarse pelt deer"): (Capricornis crispus) is a Japanese goat-antelope found in dense woodland primarily in northern and central Honshu. 
|- 
|Japanese giant flying squirrel 
|Fauna 
|(musasabi, Petaurista leucogenys) is native to Japan where it inhabits sub-alpine forests and boreal evergreen forests on Honshu, Shikoku and Kyushu. 
|- 
|Japanese boar 
|Fauna 
|(Sus scrofa leucomystax, aka white-moustached pig, Nihon-inoshishi (ニホンイノシシ)), is a subspecies of wild boar native to all of Japan, save for Hokkaido and the Ryukyu Islands. 
|- 
|Japanese bush warbler 
|Fauna 
|(uguisu (鶯), is an Asian passerine bird more often heard than seen. It's a year-round resident of Japan (except Hokkaido where it is only in summer). 
|- 
|Sasakia charonda 
|Fauna 
|National butterfly of Japan (ō-murasaki, "great purple") 
|- 
|Copper pheasant 
|Fauna 
|(Syrmaticus soemmerringii) a large pheasant with a rich coppery chestnut plumage is endemic to Japan. 
|- 
|Green pheasant 
|Fauna 
|(Phasianus versicolor), aka Japanese green pheasant, is an omnivorous bird native to the Japanese archipelago, to which it is endemic. 
|- 
|Grey Heron 
|Fauna 
|(Ardea cinerea) Long legged wading bird. 
|-
|Japanese scops owl
|Fauna
|(Otus semitorques) is a resident breeder in Japan and found in other countries in East Asia. 
|- 
| Doryrhamphus japonicus 
| Fauna 
| Doryrhamphus japonicus, or the Honshu pipefish, is a species of flagtail pipefish  
|-
|Brahmaea japonica
|Fauna
|(Japanese owl moth) a species of moth of the Brahmaeidae family native to Japan.
|-
|Japanese spider crab
|Fauna
|(Macrocheira kaempferi) a marine crab with the largest leg-span of any arthropod. They live off the southern coasts of Honshū from Tokyo Bay to Kagoshima Prefecture.
|-
|Chum salmon
|Fauna
|(aka white salmon (白鮭 シロサケ) is native to middle and northern Honshu, Hokkaido and the North Pacific.
|-
|Silurus biwaensis
|Fauna
|The giant Lake Biwa catfish or Biwako-o'namazu, endemic to Lake Biwa.
|-
|Oncorhynchus kawamurae
|Fauna
|A species of landlocked Pacific trout in Japan. It's endemic to Lake Tazawa, Akita Prefecture, but was translocated to Lake Saiko. 
|- 
|Akita Inu 
|Fauna 
|(秋田犬, Akita-inu) is a historic dog breed of large size originating from the mountains in Akita Prefecture (northern Honshu). 
|- 
|Kai Ken 
|Fauna 
|The Kai Ken (甲斐犬) is a rare breed of dog native to Japan. It is originally from Kai Province in Yamanashi Prefecture. 
|- 
|Kishu 
|Fauna 
|Kishu Ken are a rare dog breed that was selectively bred for the hunting of wild boar and deer in the mountainous Mie prefecture and Wakayama prefecture.  
|- 
|Shiba Inu 
|Fauna 
|The Shiba Inu (柴犬), is an original and distinct spitz breed hunting dog, native to Japan. 
|- 
| Japanese rose
| Flora 
| (Rosa rugosa), a species of rose native to eastern Asia and Japan. 
|- 
|Hydrangea hirta 
|Flora 
|A species of flowering plant in the family Hydrangeaceae that is native to East Asia and common in the Pacific side of Honshu. 
|- 
|Tsuga sieboldii 
|Flora 
|(Tsuga sieboldii or simply tsuga (栂)), is a conifer native to the Japanese islands of Honshū, Kyūshū, Shikoku and Yakushima. 
|}

Geologic activity

Being on the Ring of Fire, the island of Honshu is seismically active, and is home to 40 active volcanoes.

In 2011, an earthquake of magnitude 9.0–9.1 occurred off the coast of Honshu, generating tsunami waves up to 40.5 meters (133 ft) high and killing 19,747. It was the most powerful earthquake ever recorded in Japan, and the fourth most powerful earthquake in the world since modern record-keeping began in 1900. The tsunami subsequently led to the meltdown of 3 nuclear reactors at the Fukushima Daiichi Nuclear Power Plant, leading to the Fukushima nuclear disaster.

Parks

Economy

Honshu island generates around US$4 trillion or 4/5 of Japan's GDP.

Agriculture 
Fruit, vegetables, grains, rice and cotton make up the main produce grown in Honshu. The Tohoku region, spanning the north-eastern part of the island, is notable for its rice production, with 65% of cultivated land being rice paddy fields – almost a quarter of all paddy fields in Japan. Chiba Prefecture is famous for its peanuts, also being the largest producer in Japan. Rare species of the lichen genus Menegazzia are found only in Honshu.

Industry 
Most of Japan's tea and silk is from Honshu. Japan's three largest industrial regions are all located on Honshu: the Keihin region, the Hanshin Industrial Region, and the Chūkyō Industrial Area.

Minerals and fuels 
Honshu is home to a large portion of Japan's minimal mineral reserves along housing small deposits of oil and coal. Several coal deposits are also located in the northern part of the island, concentrated in Fukushima Prefecture and Niigata Prefecture, though Honshu's coal production is negligible in comparison to Hokkaido and Kyushu. Most of Japan's oil reserves are also located in northern Honshu, along the west coast, spanning Niigata, Yamagata and Akita Prefectures.

In terms of mineral resources, Honshu houses the majority of Japan's copper, lead, zinc and chromite. Smaller deposits of gold, silver, arsenic, sulphur and pyrite are also scattered across the island.

Transportation
The Tokaido Shinkansen, opened in 1964 between Tokyo and Shin-Ōsaka, is Japan's first high-speed rail line. It is the world's oldest high-speed rail line and one of the most heavily used. The San'yō Shinkansen, connects the two largest cities in western Japan, Shin-Osaka in Osaka with Hakata Station in Fukuoka. Both the Tokaido Shinkansen and the Sanyo Shinkansen help form a continuous high-speed railway through the Taiheiyō Belt megalopolis.

Administrative regions and prefectures
The island is divided into five nominal regions and contains 34 prefectures, including metropolitan Tokyo. Administratively, some smaller islands are included within these prefectures, notably including the Ogasawara Islands, Sado Island, Izu Ōshima, and Awaji Island.

The regions and their prefectures are:

Tōhoku region consists of six prefectures.
 

Kantō region consists of seven prefectures, including the capital of Japan which is the Tokyo Metropolis.

 

Chūbu region consists of nine prefectures.

 

Kansai region consists of seven prefectures.

Chūgoku region consists of five prefectures.

See also 

 Geography of Japan
 Hokkaido
 Japanese archipelago
 Kyushu
 Okinawa
 Shikoku

References

External links 
 
 

 
Islands of Japan
Japanese archipelago